The 1999 International Raiffeisen Grand Prix was a men's tennis tournament played on Clay in St. Pölten, Austria that was part of the World Series of the 1999 ATP Tour. It was the nineteenth edition of the tournament and was held from 17–23 May 1999.

Seeds
Champion seeds are indicated in bold text while text in italics indicates the round in which those seeds were eliminated.

Draw

Finals

Top half

Bottom half

References

International Raiffeisen Grand Prix
Hypo Group Tennis International